In enzymology, a 2-hexadecenal reductase is an enzyme that catalyzes the chemical reaction

hexadecanal + NADP+  2-trans-hexadecenal + NADPH + H+

Thus, the two substrates of this enzyme are hexadecanal and NADP+, whereas its 3 products are 2-trans-hexadecenal, NADPH, and H+.

This enzyme belongs to the family of oxidoreductases, specifically those acting on the CH-CH group of donor with NAD+ or NADP+ as acceptor.  The systematic name of this enzyme class is hexadecanal:NADP+ Delta2-oxidoreductase. Other names in common use include 2-alkenal reductase, and hexadecanal: NADP+ oxidoreductase.

References

 

EC 1.3.1
NADPH-dependent enzymes
Enzymes of unknown structure